George Tsypin is an American stage designer, sculptor and architect.
He was an artistic director, production designer and coauthor of the script for the Opening Ceremony of the Olympic Games in Sochi in 2014.

Early life and education
Tsypin was born in Kazgorodok, Kazakhstan (former Soviet Union), where his parents were in internal exile after being released from GULAG as political prisoners. He studied architecture in Moscow and theater design at NYU in New York.

Career 
Tsypin has worked for many years with renowned directors and composers, such as Julie Taymor, Peter Sellars, Francesca Zambello, Pierre Audi, Jurgen Flimm, Philip Glass, John Adams, Kaija Saariaho and Andrey Konchalovsky.

He has won many awards, including the International Competition of "New and Spontaneous Ideas for the Theater for Future Generations" at Georges Pompidou Center in Paris.

His designs for opera have been produced all over the world, including Salzburg Festival, Opera de Bastille in Paris, Covent Garden in London, La Scala in Milan, Mariinsky Theater in Saint Petersburg, Bolshoi Theater in Moscow and Metropolitan Opera in New York.

Tsypin has worked in all major theaters in the United States, as well as in film and television.

His sculpture received its first one-man gallery show in 1991 at the Twining Gallery in New York. He created the Planet Earth Gallery, one of the Millennium Projects in England: a major installation of moving architectural elements, videos and 200 sculptures.

Tsypin was chosen to exhibit his work at the Venice Biennale in 2002. His monograph, GEORGE TSYPIN OPERA FACTORY: Building in the Black Void, was published by Princeton Architectural Press in 2005.

Tsypin's Broadway debut as a set designer for a musical was Disney Theatrical's production of The Little Mermaid, at the Lunt-Fontanne Theatre. He designed the set for the new musical Spider-Man: Turn Off the Dark for which he won Outer Critics Award and received Tony Award nomination.

He designed the SeaGlass Carousel for Battery Park next to the World Trade Center site.

Family

George lives in New York with his wife Galina. He has two daughters, Allie, a film director, and Sonja, a cinematographer.

Selected publications
Sculpting Space in the Theater: Conversations with the top set, light and costume designers - Paperback (Oct. 12, 2006) by Babak Ebrahimian
 George Tsypin Opera Factory: Invisible City, Princeton Architectural Press, 2016 
GEORGE TSYPIN OPERA FACTORY: Building in the Black Void" Princeton Architectural Press, 2005.
Inside George Tsypin Opera Factory by Lucy Lu, Peking, 2012.
Into the Abiss: Essays on Scenography by Arnold Aronson, University of Michigan Press, 2005
Tony Davis, Stage Design, RotoVision, 2001
Ronn Smith, American Set Design 2'', pp. 159–173, Theatre Communications Group Inc, 1991
"George Tsypin", Polyhymnion

References

1954 births
American contemporary artists
Living people
Opera designers
American scenic designers
Soviet emigrants to the United States